Roger M.J. De Neef (Wemmel, 24 June 1941) is a Flemish writer and poet.

Bibliography
 Winterrunen (1967) 
 Lichaam mijn landing (1970) 
 De grote wolk (1972) 
 Gestorven getal (1977) 
 Gedichten van licht en overspel (1982) 
 De vertelkunst van de bloemen (1985) 
 De halsband van de duif (1993) 
 Blues for a reason (1995) 
 Empty bed blues (1996) 
 De kou van liefde (1999)

Awards
 1986 - Driejaarlijkse Staatsprijs voor Poëzie
 1987 - Arkprijs van het Vrije Woord

See also
 Flemish literature

Sources
 Roger M.J. De Neef
 G.J. van Bork en P.J. Verkruijsse, De Nederlandse en Vlaamse auteurs (1985)

1941 births
Flemish writers
Living people
Ark Prize of the Free Word winners